Leszek Górski (born 19 August 1961) is a retired Polish swimmer who won a silver medal in the 400 m individual medley at the 1981 European Aquatics Championships. He finished seventh in the same event at the 1980 Summer Olympics. During his career he won 13 national titles and set 32 national records in 50 m and 25 m pools.

In 1979 he had a serious operation on the left knee, but recovered for the Olympics. However, after a second operation in 1982, he could not perform at the international level. He retired from competitions in 1988 and became a swimming coach. He is married to Ewa Górska and has a daughter Anna (b. 1983) and son Michał (b. 1986). He lives in Wrocław.

References

1961 births
Living people
Polish male medley swimmers
Swimmers at the 1980 Summer Olympics
Olympic swimmers of Poland
Sportspeople from Olsztyn
European Aquatics Championships medalists in swimming
20th-century Polish people